Junkyard is the third studio album by Australian post-punk group The Birthday Party. It was released on 10 May 1982 by Missing Link Records in Australia and by 4AD in the UK. It was the group's last full-length studio recording. It has received critical acclaim.

Background
Junkyard was inspired by American Southern Gothic imagery, dealing with extreme subjects like an evangelist's murdered daughter. Anita Lane, then girlfriend of lead singer Nick Cave, co-wrote two songs for the album: "Dead Joe" and "Kiss Me Black".

The album was a transitional record for a variety of reasons. On 16 February 1982 in Melbourne, Tracy Pew (the band's bass player) was arrested for drunk driving. For this and several other outstanding offences he served 2.5 months in Pentridge Prison in Australia, and so Barry Adamson played bass on at least one track. In addition to his usual guitar, Mick Harvey played drums on a few songs, anticipating the upcoming termination of founding member Phill Calvert and the band's subsequent switch from quintet to quartet.

Recording and artwork
The album was recorded with Tony Cohen at Armstrong's Audio Visual (A.A.V.) Studios in Melbourne in December 1981 and January 1982. Additional tracks were recorded in London's Matrix Studios with producer Richard Mazda in March 1982. Mazda's previous work with ATV and The Fall had brought him to their attention.

The cover art is by Ed Roth and Dave Christensen.

Release 
The album was released on 10 May 1982.

CD reissues added the "Release the Bats"/"Blast Off!" single recorded at London's Townhouse Studio with Nick Launay in April 1981. A second version of "Dead Joe"—originally featured on the MasterBAG August 1982 flexi-disc—also appears on the reissue.

Critical reception

Critic Ned Raggett called the album a "scuzzy masterpiece" that saw "Cave's now-demonic vocals in full roar while the rest of the players revamped rhythm & blues and funk into a blood-soaked exorcism." Julian Marszalek of The Quietus writes that "Junkyard still sounds as if it’s waiting for rock music to catch up with it," calling it "a high example of uncompromised music and art [...] that exists purely on its own terms."

In October 2010, Junkyard was listed at No. 17 in the book, 100 Best Australian Albums. The album was also included in the book 1001 Albums You Must Hear Before You Die.

Track listing

Personnel

The Birthday Party
Nick Cave – lead vocals
Mick Harvey – guitar, percussion ("She's Hit"), drums ("Dead Joe", "Hamlet (Pow, Pow, Pow)"), saxophone ("Big-Jesus-Trash-Can"), bass guitar ("Kewpie Doll"), organ ("Blast Off!"), bass drum ("Release the Bats")
Rowland S. Howard – guitar, saxophone ("Blast Off!")
Tracy Pew – bass guitar
Phill Calvert – drums

Additional personnel
Barry Adamson – bass guitar ("Kiss Me Black")

Chart positions

References

External links

Junkyard (Adobe Flash) at Radio3Net (streamed copy where licensed)

1982 albums
Junkyard
Albums produced by Nick Launay
4AD albums
Virgin Records albums
Shock Records albums
2.13.61 albums
Buddah Records albums
Albums produced by Richard Mazda
Albums produced by Tony Cohen